Choton Kisku is an Indian politician belonging to All India Trinamool Congress. He was elected as MLA of Phansidewa Vidhan Sabha Constituency in West Bengal Legislative Assembly in 2006.

References

Living people
Trinamool Congress politicians from West Bengal
West Bengal MLAs 2006–2011
Year of birth missing (living people)
Santali people